Filip Jörgensen (born 16 April 2002) is a professional footballer who plays as a goalkeeper for Spanish club Villarreal CF. Born in Sweden, he plays for Denmark internationally.

As a native of the city of Lomma, Jörgensen was capped several times for Sweden at U16 and U17 levels before switching allegiance to Denmark, which he qualifies for via his Danish father.

Club career
Born in Lomma, Jörgensen joined Villarreal CF's youth setup in 2017, after representing RCD Mallorca, AD Penya Arrabal, Club Santa Catalina Atlético, Malmö FF and GIF Nike Lomma. In 2020, after finishing his formation, he was promoted to the reserves in Segunda División B.

Jörgensen made his senior debut on 18 October 2020, starting in a 0–1 away loss against SCR Peña Deportiva. On 12 November, he renewed his contract until 2025.

Jörgensen made his first team debut on 15 December 2021, coming on as a second-half substitute for Gerónimo Rulli in a 7–1 away routing of Atlético Sanluqueño CF, for the season's Copa del Rey. He made his professional debut with the B-side on 14 August 2022, starting in a 2–0 Segunda División away win over Racing de Santander.

International career
Jörgensen was born in Sweden to a Danish father and Swedish mother. He represented Sweden at under-16 and under-17 levels before switching allegiance to Denmark in May 2021, and playing for the nation's under-21 side.

Career statistics

References

External links
Profile at the Villarreal CF website

2002 births
Living people
People from Lomma Municipality
Danish men's footballers
Denmark under-21 international footballers
Swedish footballers
Sweden youth international footballers
Danish people of Swedish descent
Swedish people of Danish  descent
Association football goalkeepers
Segunda División players
Primera Federación players
Segunda División B players
Villarreal CF B players
Villarreal CF players
Danish expatriate men's footballers
Swedish expatriate footballers
Danish expatriate sportspeople in Spain
Swedish expatriate sportspeople in Spain
Expatriate footballers in Spain